Arsenius (Latinized form) and Arsenios (Greek form) is a male first name. It is derived from the Greek word arsenikos (ἀρσενικός), meaning "male", "virile". 

It may refer to:

 Saint Arsenius the Great (c. 350 – 445), also known as Arsenius the Deacon, Arsenius of Scetis and Turah, and Arsenius the Roman
 Saint Arsenius of Corfu, first bishop of Corfu, (d. 800 AD or perhaps 959 AD) one of the principal patron saints of Corfu
 Patriarch Arsenius of Alexandria, Patriarch of Alexandria from 1000 to 1010
 Arsenius Autorianus (died 1273), Patriarch of Constantinople
 Arsenius Apostolius (c. 1468 – 1538), Greek scholar and Bishop of Monemvasia
 Gualterus Arsenius (? – c. 1580), instrument maker
 Arsenius Walsh (1804 – 1869), Irish Catholic missionary in Hawaii
 Saint Arsenios the Cappadocian (1840-1924), god father and spiritual father of Saint Paisios of Mount Athos
 Arsenius Stadnitsky (1862 – 1936), Archbishop and then Metropolitan of Novgorod from 1910 to 1933
 Arsenios the Cave-Dweller (1886 – 1983), Greek Orthodox monk and elder at Mount Athos

Variants
Armenian: Arsen
Georgian: Arsena
French: Arsène
Italian, Portuguese and Spanish: Arsenio
Kazakh: Arsen
Macedonian: Arsen
Polish: Arseniusz
Romanian: Arsenie
Russian: Arseny (also transliterated as Arseni, Arseniy, Arsenij, Arsenii). The Russian surname Arsenyev is derived from it. The older form of this name is Arsentiy (Арсентий)
Serbian, Bosnian and some other South Slavic languages: Arsenije and diminutives Arsen, Arsa
Lithuanian: Arsenijus
Hungarian: Arzén

References

Given names of Greek language origin
Masculine given names